The 2012 South American Under-23 Championships in Athletics were held in São Paulo, Brazil, at the Estádio Ícaro de Castro Melo from 22 to 23 September 2012. They were the 5th edition of the competition, organised under the supervision of the CONSUDATLE. A detailed report on the results was given. Brazilian shot putters Geisa Arcanjo who achieved 18.43m in the women's event, and Darlan Romani who achieved 19.93m in the men's event, were awarded the title for the best performance of the event.

Participation
A total of 240 athletes from 12 nations participated at the championships. Other sources count only 236 athletes. An unofficial count through the result lists resulted in 234 participating athletes:

 (27)
 (6)
 (75)
 (21)
 (28)
 (8)
 (4)
 (2)
 (7)
 (20)
 (11)
 (25)

Suriname was the only CONSUDATLE member federation absent.

Records
A total of 13 new championships records were set.

Medal summary

Complete results were published.

Men

Women

Medal table

Points table

Men

Women

References

South American Under-23 Championships in Athletics
Athletics
South American U23
International sports competitions in São Paulo
International athletics competitions hosted by Brazil
2012 in youth sport